The 1968 Detroit Lions season was their 39th in the league. The team failed to improve on their previous season's output of 5–7–2, winning only four games. They missed the playoffs for the eleventh straight season.

NFL Draft 

Notes

 Detroit traded DT Roger Brown to Los Angeles in exchange for the Rams' first- and third-round selections (24th and 74th) and second-round selection in 1969.
 Detroit traded its third-round selection (65th) and fourth-round selection in 1969 to San Francisco in exchange for RB David Kopay.
 Detroit traded its seventeenth-round selection (445th) to Minnesota in exchange for Minnesota's sixteenth-round selection in 1969.

Roster

Schedule 

Note: The October 6 game against Minnesota was originally scheduled to be played in Detroit. The game was switched with the November 17 game due to game 4 of the World Series.

Season summary

Week 5

Standings

References 

Detroit Lions seasons
Detroit Lions
Detroit Lions